Wang Yameng (born 1981 in Qingdao, Shandong) is a Chinese classical guitarist. She has studied with Chen Zhi.

She has also performed in a quartet formation, Four Angels, with Su Meng, Li Jie and Chen Shanshan.

Discography
Caprice 1999 (GHA)
Classic Guitar - Aquarelle, Un Sueno en la Floresta 2004 (JSCP)
Guitar Concert in Korea by Four Angels Quartet, 2006 (Alma Guitar)

Video
 Yameng Wang & Meng Su  (Guitar Concert in Korea - Live) 2005 (Alma Guitar)
Guitar Concert in Korea by Four Angels Quartet, 2006 (Alma Guitar)

External links

Homepages
Beijing Guitar Duo (Duo: with Meng Su)

Biographical
Biography (Peabody Institute)
Biography (www.almaguitar.com)
Biography (www.zhguitar.com)

Other
Jonathan Palevsky interviews the Beijing Guitar Duo (Meng Su & Yameng Wang) and their mentor Manuel Barrueco (March 20, 2010) (ref)

1981 births
Living people
Chinese classical guitarists
Musicians from Qingdao
People's Republic of China musicians
Place of birth missing (living people)
Women classical guitarists
21st-century guitarists
21st-century women guitarists